A special election was held in  on five occasions between September 25, 1801 and July 29, 1802 to fill a vacancy left by the resignation of Silas Lee (F) on August 20, 1801, prior to the beginning of the 1st Session of the 7th Congress.

Election results

First three ballots
The first three ballots had similar results and were held on September 25 and December 7, 1801 and April 5, 1802

Fourth and fifth ballots
Between the third and fourth ballots Cook and Drummer dropped out while Samuel Thatcher (DR) entered the race, eventually winning.  The final two votes were held June 7, 1802 and July 29, 1802

Thatcher took office on December 6, 1802

See also
List of special elections to the United States House of Representatives

References

United States House of Representatives 1801 12
Massachusetts 1801 12
1801 12 special
Massachusetts 12 special
Massachusetts 12 special
United States House of Representatives 12 special
United States House of Representatives 12 special
Massachusetts 1801 12